The masters men's 800 metres was an exhibition event for men in the M60 division at the 2016 IAAF World Indoor Championships held on 19 March 2016.

Joe Gough held the lead and the inside lane going into the last lap, only David Roy Wilcock followed as they separated from the pack.  Coming off the final turn, Wilcock went wide into lane 2 and outsprinted Gough.  As he saw Wilcock passing him, Gough gave it all he had and dove for the finish line, dramatically falling to the track in second place.  Oleksandr Lysenko was able to gain a slight edge on the final lap to get bronze out of a tight finish for third.

Results

References

800 metres
800 metres at the World Athletics Indoor Championships